Miss Universe 1952 was the 1st Miss Universe pageant, held at the Long Beach Municipal Auditorium in Long Beach, California, United States on June 28, 1952.

At the end of the event, actress Piper Laurie crowned Armi Kuusela of Finland as Miss Universe 1952. The competition featured the Romanov Imperial Nuptial Crown, which was previously owned by a Russian czar. The crown is said to have 1,535 diamonds, 300 carats, and was valued at $500,000.

Contestants from 30 countries and territories participated in this year's pageant. The pageant was hosted by Bob Russell.

Results

Placements

Special awards

Contestants
30 contestants competed for the title.

Notes

Replacement
  - Rosa Adela "Nenela" Prunell was replaced by Gladys Rubio Fajardo.

References

1952
1952 beauty pageants
Beauty pageants in the United States
1952 in California
Long Beach, California
June 1952 events in the United States